Qaribabad and Gharibabad may refer to various places in Iran:
 Qaribabad, Chaharmahal and Bakhtiari
 Gharibabad, Fars
 Gharibabad, Kerman
 Gharibabad, Chabahar, Sistan and Baluchestan Province
 Gharibabad, Eskelabad, Khash County, Sistan and Baluchestan Province
 Gharibabad-e Allah Dad, Khash County, Sistan and Baluchestan Province
 Gharibabad-e Nark, Khash County, Sistan and Baluchestan Province
 Gharibabad, West Azerbaijan